Depth Dwellers is a first-person shooter released in 1994 by TriSoft for MS-DOS. The game was designed to work with 3D glasses. It was also included with the Woobo Electronics CyberBoy unit.

Plot

The player is assigned to journey into the Zendle mines to accomplish what his beloved Princess Aurora could not: to rescue the Depth Dwelling men of Ora from the Ri of Riase.

Gameplay
The object of the game is for the player to make it to the exit teleporter in every level. Throughout each level, the player can destroy robotic enemies, free slaves, find secrets and collect treasure for bonus points. Wherever there is a locked door, the player is required to find one of two keys to unlock it. The player makes use of only firearms and if exhausted of ammo, cannot attack. Secrets can be found by touching a wall that is different in appearance.

Reception

PC Zone claimed that the game was like a bizarre cross between Doom and Blake Stone, leaving much to be desired but having its own gentle charm. The review negatively scored the bad sound design and the flat sprites, calling them "unexciting". Computer Gaming World regarded the graphics as slightly better than Wolfenstein 3D, praising the realistic sounds and gameplay but criticizing the limited save slot system.

References

External links

1994 video games
First-person shooters
DOS games
DOS-only games
Video games with 2.5D graphics
Video games developed in the United States
Sprite-based first-person shooters